Hamilton Fish Kean (February 27, 1862December 27, 1941) was a U.S. Senator from New Jersey.

Early life
Kean was the son of Lucy (née Halstead) and John Kean. He was related to several prominent American politicians including his great-grandfather John Kean (1756–1795), his brother John Kean (1852–1914). He was named after his great-uncle Hamilton Fish.

Kean was born at "Ursino", his ancestral estate near Elizabeth, New Jersey.  He attended the public schools of Elizabeth, graduated from St. Paul's School, Concord, New Hampshire.

Career
Kean engaged in banking and agricultural pursuits.  In 1893, along with Robert V. Van Cortlandt he formed the investment firm of Kean & Van Cortlandt, which later became Kean, Taylor & Co.

From 1919 to 1928, Kean was a member of the Republican National Committee.  He was an unsuccessful candidate for the Republican nomination for United States Senator in 1924 and was elected to the Senate in 1928, serving a single six-year term before a failed re-election bid, losing to former Governor A. Harry Moore.

After his political career, he worked in banking until his death in 1941.  Kean was elected to the Board of Directors of the National Commercial Title and Mortgage Guarantee Company, the Associated Company, the Lawyers Title Guarantee Company of New Jersey, and the Plainfield-Union Water Company

Personal life
On January 12, 1888, Kean was married to Katharine Taylor Winthrop (1866–1943).  Katharine was the daughter of banker Robert Winthrop and Katherine (née Taylor) Winthrop and the sister of Beekman Winthrop, who served as Asst. Secretary of the Navy and Asst. Secretary of the Treasury.  The Winthrops were descendantants of John Winthrop, the Puritan lawyer and one of the leading figures in the founding of the Massachusetts Bay Colony. Together, they were the parents of:

 John Kean (1888–1949)
 Robert Winthrop Kean (1893–1980), who married Elizabeth Stuyvesent Howard (1898–1988).

Kean died on December 27, 1941, at St. Luke's Hospital in New York City.  After a funeral at Grace Church in New York, he was interred in Green-Wood Cemetery in Brooklyn.

References

External links

1862 births
1941 deaths
Fish family
Politicians from Elizabeth, New Jersey
Republican Party United States senators from New Jersey
New Jersey Republicans
Hamilton Fish
Schuyler family
Livingston family
Burials at Green-Wood Cemetery
Winthrop family